Ikwezi Local Municipality was a local municipality in the Sarah Baartman District Municipality of the Eastern Cape in South Africa. Ikwezi is an isiXhosa name that means "morning star". After municipal elections on 3 August 2016 it was merged into the larger Dr Beyers Naudé Local Municipality.

Main places
The 2001 census divided the municipality into the following main places:

Politics 

The municipal council consisted of seven members elected by mixed-member proportional representation. Four councillors were elected by first-past-the-post voting in four wards, while the remaining three were chosen from party lists so that the total number of party representatives was proportional to the number of votes received. In the election of 18 May 2011 the African National Congress (ANC) won a majority of five seats on the council.
The following table shows the results of the election.

References

External links
 Official website

Former local municipalities of South Africa